TOT Public Company Limited (Thai: ทีโอที) is a Thai state-owned telecommunications company. Originally established in 1954 and corporatized in 2002, TOT used to be known as the Telephone Organization of Thailand and TOT Corporation Public Company Limited. TOT's main line of business is fixed line telephony, although it has several other businesses, including mobile telephony. Since 2021, TOT PCL become National Telecom Public Company Limited after merger with CAT Telecom.

Early history
The first use of the telephone in Thailand began during the reign of King Rama V in 1881 with a telephone line constructed between the Bangkok, and Paknam, in Samut Prakan, a short distance south of Bangkok along the Chao Phraya River. Its purpose was to inform Bangkok of the arrival and departure of ships at Paknam.

The Telephone Organization of Thailand was founded by the Thai government on 24 February 1954.  A state enterprise under the Ministry of Transport and Communications, it incorporated the Telephone Technician Unit under The Post and Telegraph Department. It originally had 732 staff members and a budget of 50 million baht. The TOT provided telephone services in the Bangkok metropolis, which included Wat Lieb, Bang Rak, Ploenchit, and Sam Sen Exchanges.

TOT was transformed from a state-owned enterprise under the control of the Transport and Communication Ministry to a public company named TOT Corporation Public on 31 July 2002.

Corporate status change and the aftermath of the 2006 coup
Under the deposed government of Thaksin Shinawatra (2001–2006), TOT became a corporation and plans were under way to privatise a portion of the state enterprise through an IPO on the Stock Exchange of Thailand. These plans were cancelled after the Thaksin government was overthrown by a coup on 19 September 2006. Soon after the coup, the junta of General Surayud Chulanont announced plans to merge TOT with rival state telecom enterprise CAT Telecom (formerly the Communications Authority of Thailand).

The junta also appointed junta assistant secretary-general General Saprang Kalayanamitr as the new chairman of the board of directors of TOT. General Saprang's first move as TOT chairman was to hand-pick three Army colonels and controversial Thaksin-critic Vuthiphong Priebjrivat to sit on the state enterprise's board of directors.

The junta cancelled the Thaksin government's telecom excise tax policy. The Thaksin government had imposed an excise tax on privately offered fixed and cellular services, and then allowed telecom companies to deduct the amount they paid in excise tax from concession fees they had to pay to state concession owners TOT and CAT Telecom. The amount paid by the private telecom firms did not change. The Surayud government's excise tax cancellation meant that TOT and CAT Telecom would receive their full concession payments.  However, TOT and CAT were then forced to increase their dividends to the Ministry of Finance to account for their increased income.

In December 2009, TOT became Thailand's first 3G mobile phone service provider, launching 3G mobile phone service (Phase 1) via the brand TOT3G, by enhancing 584 base stations in Bangkok and its vicinity to accommodate 500,000 numbers for the service and with a goal of nationwide coverage by the end of 2011.

Restructuring plan

In August 2014, TOT was ordered by the State Enterprise Policy Commission to submit a proposal that would wind down non-core businesses, allowing it to reduce costs. Known in Thailand as the "superboard", the commission was established by Thailand's National Council for Peace and Order (NCPO) and tasked with assessing the operations of state enterprises. TOT restructuring plan includes  splitting into six subsidiary operations that would then partner with private firms.

TOT plans to streamline its business into the following six key areas:

 Telecoms infrastructure 
 Towers 
 Broadband 
 Mobile wholesale 
 ICT and cloud
 International gateway/submarine cable

TOT announced its intention to upgrade its business, through public–private partnership (PPP) and commercial agreements with third-party companies. Among the companies that have expressed interest in a partnership with TOT are: 
 Advanced Info Service (AIS) 
 MVNE One Development 
 Softbank (Softbank Corporation) 
 Loxley Pcl.
 MobileLTE 

On 7 January 2021, TOT PCL agreed to merge with CAT Telecom into a new company, National Telecom Public Company Limited (NT) according to the cabinet resolution by Ministry of Digital Economy and Society under Prime Minister Prayut Chan-o-cha. After a successful merger, a new company will have the most integrated infrastructure and has the most network coverage, all ranges of telephone frequencies and the best quality of use make it have the potential and the ability to serve both government customers, the private sector and the people of all areas receive a strong network service to help increase the development potential of the country to enter Thailand 4.0 and also help promote the competitiveness of private customers and SME, the general public will receive telecommunication services that cover all areas of the country to access the digital world.

Mobile Virtual Network Operator Host

TOT is also a host network operator, who hosts Mobile virtual network operator (MVNOs).

As of January 2017, TOT had two MVNOs operating on its network:
 i-Kool 3G (Loxley)
 IEC3G - Renamed to Tron IEC3G 

End of 2016 the MVNO's and TOT itself, had a combined market share of 0.18% representing 163,658 subscribers out of a total market size of 90,921,572.

In January 2017, TOT's financial statement reported total revenue of THB 30.8 billion in 2016. Ebitda of THB 1.6 billion, and a Net Loss of THB 5.8 billion

References

External links

Telecommunications companies of Thailand
Telecommunications companies established in 1954
1954 establishments in Thailand
Government-owned companies of Thailand
Government-owned telecommunications companies
Telecommunications companies disestablished in 2021
2021 disestablishments in Thailand